Sir George Benson (3 May 1889 – 17 August 1973) was a British Labour Party politician.

The son of T. D. Benson, treasurer of the Independent Labour Party (ILP), George was educated at Manchester Grammar School, Manchester and became clerk in an  estate office. During the First World War he was imprisoned as a conscientious objector. He served as Member of Parliament (MP) for Chesterfield from 1929 to 1931, and from 1935 to 1964 and was knighted in 1958.

Benson wrote on financial matters and authored a book on the history of socialism. He was chairman of the Howard League for Penal Reform and a member of the Home Office Advisory Council on delinquency.

Death
He died in Surrey in 1973, aged 83.

References

British conscientious objectors
Independent Labour Party National Administrative Committee members
Labour Party (UK) MPs for English constituencies
Members of the Parliament of the United Kingdom for constituencies in Derbyshire
UK MPs 1935–1945
UK MPs 1945–1950
1889 births
1973 deaths
UK MPs 1929–1931
UK MPs 1950–1951
UK MPs 1951–1955
UK MPs 1955–1959
UK MPs 1959–1964